Lower Denford is a hamlet in the civil parish of Kintbury in the English county of Berkshire.

External links

Hamlets in Berkshire
Kintbury